Simon Kirch (born 26 September 1979 in Neuwied) is a German track and field athlete specialised in the 400 metres. A two time national champion, Kirch participated in the 2008 Summer Olympics in Beijing as part of the German 4 × 400m relay team which failed to reach the final.

References

External links 
 

1979 births
Living people
People from Neuwied
German male sprinters
German national athletics champions
Olympic athletes of Germany
Athletes (track and field) at the 2008 Summer Olympics
Sportspeople from Rhineland-Palatinate